"aventure bleu" is Japanese voice actress and singer Maaya Uchida's 7th single, released on February 14, 2018. The titular song from the single was used as the opening theme for the anime Takunomi.

Track listings

Charts

Event 
 『 Maaya Party！7』　Maaya Uchida 7th Single Release Event「Maaya Party！7」（February 24, 2018 - March 11, 2018：Tokyo, Aichi, Osaka）

Album

References

2018 singles
2018 songs
J-pop songs
Japanese-language songs
Pony Canyon singles
Anime songs